Sky Network Television Limited, more commonly known as Sky, is a New Zealand broadcasting company that provides pay television services via satellite, media streaming services and broadband internet services. It is also a wholesale channel provider to New Zealand IPTV provider Vodafone. As at 31 December 2022, Sky had 1,023,378 residential television subscribers consisting of 517,003 satellite subscribers and 506,375 streaming subscribers. Additionally, Sky had 23,156 broadband customers. Despite the similarity of name, branding and services, such as Sky Go and MySky shared with its European equivalent, Sky, there is no connection between the companies.

History

The company was founded by Craig Heatley, Terry Jarvis, Trevor Farmer and Alan Gibbs in 1987 as Sky Media Limited. It was formed to investigate beaming sports programming into nightclubs and pubs using high performance 4-metre satellite dishes by Jarvis and an engineering associate Brian Green, but was redirected into pay television following successful bidding in early 1990 for four groups of UHF frequencies in the Auckland, Hamilton and Tauranga regions. Initially operating only in the Auckland region, Sky contracted Broadcast Communications (now Kordia) to provide the broadcast service and transmission from its Panorama Road studios, formerly owned by defunct broadcaster Northern Television. The first Sky subscriber was former Speaker of the New Zealand House of Representatives Jonathan Hunt, according to Helen Clark, former Prime Minister of New Zealand.

The concept of a pay television service was new to New Zealand and Sky had early problems. These included viewer acceptance of subscriber television. It faced difficulty in educating retailers and customers on the use of the original decoders. However, this problem was eased with the introduction of easier-to-use decoders that allowed greater viewer flexibility.

UHF service
Sky originally launched on 18 May 1990 as an analogue UHF service. Subscribers required a VideoCrypt decoder and a UHF aerial, both of which were supplied by when joining Sky. The signal was sent with the picture scrambled using VideoCrypt technology; the decoder was used to unscramble the picture. Sky Movies was the only channel broadcast in NICAM stereo; Sky Sport and Sky News were broadcast in mono. The original decoder didn't actually support stereo sound; if a subscriber wanted to watch Sky Movies in stereo, the subscriber had to feed the audio from another source such as a NICAM stereo capable VCR.

Free-to-air broadcasts were shown in the early morning hours on Sky News and between 5 pm and 6 pm on Sky Sport until mid-1991; however, those without a Sky subscription could view the broadcasts without a UHF decoder by tuning their TV to the Sky News or Sky Sport UHF channel, as the signals were not scrambled during those times.

The original channel lineup consisted of three channels, Sky Movies (later renamed to HBO before reverting to its original name), Sky Sport and Sky News. Sky rapidly won long term rights from US sports network ESPN (which became a 1% shareholder) as well as CNN and HBO providing it with a supply of sports, news and movies for the three channels. Sky News screened a mixture of CNN International and BBC news bulletins and a replay of the 6 pm One Network News bulletin from TVNZ, later changing to a replay of the 3 News 6 pm bulletin from TV3. The Sky News channel was later discontinued and became branded as a CNN channel.

In 1994, Sky launched two further channels, Discovery Channel and Orange, Orange later became known as Sky 1 and then The Box. Discovery Channel broadcast on a channel already used by Trackside. The Trackside service was available free to air to anyone who could receive the UHF signal without the need for a Sky decoder, Discovery Channel screened outside of racing hours and was only available to Sky subscribers.

Orange broadcast from 10 am onwards each day with Juice TV screening outside of Orange's broadcast hours, Juice TV was available originally free to air. Cartoon Network shared the same channel as Orange from 1997 to 2000 screening between 6 am and 4 pm with Orange screening after 4 pm. In 2000, Cartoon Network was replaced with Nickelodeon.

Later, funding allowed Sky to extend its coverage throughout most of New Zealand: In 1991, the company expanded to Rotorua, Wellington and Christchurch. Then in 1994, the company expanded to Hawke's Bay, Manawatu, Southland and Otago, followed by the Wairarapa, Taupo, and Wanganui regions in 1995. Its final UHF expansion, in 1996, was to Taranaki, Whangarei, and eastern Bay of Plenty Region.

Following the launch of the digital satellite service in 1998 (see below), Sky began reducing services on the UHF platform. NICAM stereo was eventually removed from Sky Movies, the CNN channel was discontinued in 2004 with the UHF frequencies issued to Māori Television.

Sky switched off its analogue UHF TV service on 11 March 2010 at midnight.

Sky used a portion of the freed up UHF and radio spectrum to launch its joint venture, Igloo, in December 2012. The remaining unused spectrum was relinquished back to the Government and will be recycled to support new broadcasting ventures.

Satellite service

In April 1997, Sky introduced a nationwide analogue direct broadcasting via satellite (DBS) service over the Optus B1 satellite. This allowed it to offer more channels and interactive options, as well as nationwide coverage. It upgraded it to a digital service in December 1998.

While some channels on the UHF platform were shared with other channels, Sky Digital screened the same channels 24 hours a day. Orange (later known as Sky 1 and The Box) extended to screening 24 hours a day on Sky Digital but was only available to Sky UHF subscribers between 4 pm and 6 am. Discovery Channel was available to Sky Digital subscribers 24 hours a day but UHF subscribers could only receive the channel outside of Trackside's broadcast hours.

Digital versions of free to air channels have always been available on Sky Digital meaning that some subscribers did not need to purchase any equipment to receive digital TV when New Zealand switched off its analogue service. While most free to air channels have been available on Sky Digital, TVNZ channels TVNZ 1 and TVNZ 2 did not become available until the end of 2001.

A SkyMail email service was featured for a time, but was later pulled due to lack of interest (including the wireless keyboards they had produced for it).

The unreliability of the aging Optus B1 satellite was highlighted when the DBS service went offline just before 7 p.m. NZST (8 a.m. London, 3 a.m. New York) on 30 March 2006. The interruption affected service to over 550,000 customers and caused many decoders to advise customers of "rain fade." Due to excessive volume of calls to the Sky toll-free help-desk, Sky posted update messages on their website advising customers that they were working with Optus to restore service by midnight. Sky credited customers with one day's subscription fees as compensation for the downtime at a cost to the company of NZ$1.5 million. Sky switched its DBS service to the Optus D1 satellite on 15 November 2006. It later expanded its transponder capacity on this satellite to allow for extra channels and HD broadcasts.

My Sky launch
In December 2005, Sky released its own digital video recorder (DVR), which essentially was an upgraded set top box similar to Foxtel IQ in Australia or TiVo in the United States. Called My Sky, it offered viewers the ability to pause live television, rewind television, record up to two channels at once straight to the set top box and watch the start of a recorded programme while still recording the end. It also gave viewers access to a revamped Guide and the new Planner, used to plan and access recordings at the touch of a button.

There was software in My Sky that after an hour of no signal from Sky then the decoder locks playback of pre-recorded programmes. This was discovered on 30 March 2006, after the ageing Optus B1 satellite was out of alignment for a 13-hour period and therefore unable to broadcast Sky to over 600,000 subscribers.

This generation of box was replaced by My Sky HDi when it launched on 1 July 2008. The boxes allow connection of to up to four satellites which can work with its four TV tuner cards in any combination. The device has a 320GB HDD. The quality of My Sky HDi is 576i via component and 720/1080i via HDMI.

A new feature was released exclusive to My Sky HDi on 6 July 2010 called Record Me. This feature allows subscribers to press the green button on programme advertisements to record that advertised programme.

In May 2009, Sky introduced copy protection on My Sky and My Sky HDi decoders limiting the ability to copy material from My Sky/My Sky HDi to DVD/HDD recorders and to PCs. Sky Box Office channels, including adult channels are copy protected so DVD/HDD recorders and PCs will not record from these channels. Other channels are not copy protected. Copy protection technology is not built into other decoders.

On 1 July 2011, a version of the same decoder with a 1TB hard drive was launched as My Sky+.

Purchase of Prime Television
In November 2005, Sky announced it had purchased the free-to-air channel Prime TV for NZ$30 million. Sky uses Prime TV to promote its pay content and to show delayed sports coverage. New Zealand's Commerce Commission issued clearance for the purchase on 8 February 2006.

Purchase of Onsite Broadcasting
In July 2010, Sky purchased Onsite Broadcasting, later Outside Broadcasting (OSB), from Australia's Prime Media Group. The sale price was $35 million but once liabilities were taken into account the net amount was $13.5 million. Since 2001, OSB provided outside broadcast facilities for Sky's sporting coverage and was also contracted out by Sky to other broadcasters like TVNZ, TV3, Warner Brothers, Fox Sports, Channel 9, Ten Network, Channel 7 and BBC among others. It effectively replaced Moving Pictures, which was TVNZ's outside broadcast division, that had dominated the market. Moving Picture's assets were eventually sold when Sky's sports rights increased in the mid 2000s and OSB took hold.

OSB owned the following vehicles (until 2020's sale), based in Auckland, Wellington and Christchurch;
 HD1 and HD3: 14.3m semi-trailer production unit with expanding side, capable of holding 20+ cameras. They are supporter by tender vehicles. HD1 is based in Christchurch.
 HD2: 14.3m semi-trailer production unit with the capability of holding up to 16+ cameras. It is supported by a tender vehicle with extra production facilities. This unit is based in Wellington.
 HD4: 15m semi-trailer production unit with the capability of using 16+ cameras. It too is supported by a tender vehicle with additional production space.
 HD5: 12.5m rigid truck and can input 8+ cameras supported by a similar sized tender vehicle with additional production room. 
 HD6: Small van which is capable of 6+ cameras. It is supported by a similar sized van for storage and linking
 AUX1: Was an original outside broadcast production unit (OSB1), however it has been converted into a specialised production trailer (not a stand-alone OB trailer) for specialty cameras, additional graphics and houses any overflow production areas for larger broadcasts
 OSB2: An original standard definition 13.5m semi-trailer production unit capable of 14+ cameras. This is supported by a tender truck with additional production space. 
 HD/SD Fly Away kits: Suitable for broadcasts overseas

On 12 August 2020, Sky announced it had sold Outside Broadcasting to NEP New Zealand, part of American production company NEP Group. As part of the transaction, NEP will be Sky's outsourced technical production partner in New Zealand until at least 2030. The sale was cleared by the Commerce Commission on 5 February 2021.

News Corp sale

In February 2013, News Corp announced it would be selling the 44 percent stake in Sky TV that it acquired via a merger with Independent Newspapers Ltd in 2005.

Replacement of legacy hardware
From November 2015, Sky started replacing the legacy standard digital decoders and original 2005 My Sky decoders with a new digital decoder, manufactured by Kaon.

The Kaon Sky box includes built-in Wi-Fi. A Sky Link adapter device can be ordered for free by customers, in order to use a Wi-Fi connection on current My Sky boxes. The Kaon box has an ability to block recording features and storage capacity. The decoder upgrade allowed Sky to cease broadcasting scrambled channels using H.262 video compression in favor of H.264, which means Sky roughly doubled its capacity on satellite for additional channels and possibly Ultra H.265 HD broadcasts in the future. The upgrade of transponders to H.264 was completed in March 2019. Free-to-air channels such as Prime, Edge TV and Bravo Plus 1 remain in H.262 to be accessible to non-Sky subscribers such as Freeview viewers.

Additionally, the My Sky HDi and My Sky + decoder software was upgraded to use the same system software as the new Kaon boxes. The new Sky software had features such as internet capability, search functionality, favourite channels, and a series stack function.

The software upgrade to My Sky boxes contained many bugs and caused thousands of customers to become disgruntled. The major issue was with the screen font which Sky later addressed in a future upgrade.

Proposed merger with Vodafone New Zealand
In June 2016, Sky TV and Vodafone New Zealand agreed to merge, with Sky TV purchasing 100% of Vodafone NZ operations for a cash payment of $1.25 billion NZD and issuing new shares to the Vodafone Group. Vodafone UK will get 51% stake of the company. However, the proposed merger was rejected by the Commerce Commission which saw a plunge in Sky TV's shares.

Unbundling, IVP project and departure of CEO
In late February 2018, Sky TV announced that it would be splitting its existing Sky Basic service into two new packages called Sky Starter and Sky Entertainment, giving new and existing customers the option of building bundles. The Sky Starter package would cost $24.91 monthly, replacing the earlier Sky Basic service which cost $49.91 monthly with extra charges for sports, movie, and other premier channels. The price reduction came in response to fierce competition from streaming services such as Netflix, Lightbox, and Amazon Prime Video, which had caused the loss of 38,000 satellite subscribers the previous year. Unlike its competitors, Sky TV was dependent on a linear broadcasting model and its exclusive rights to rugby union, rugby league, netball, and cricket content. While Sky had TV hoped that this change would attract new customers, the company's stock market shares dropped by 10% in response to investor concerns about future revenue, knocking NZ$100 million off its market value.

In early March 2018, it was reported that Sky TV CEO John Fellet was pursuing talks with Netflix and Amazon Prime to share content and services. Fellet hoped to mimic the UK-based television company Sky plc's success in negotiating a bundling package with Netflix.

On 26 March 2018, John Fellet announced his intention to step down from his position, after being CEO for 17 years. Fellet had been with the company since 1991, first as chief operating officer before taking on the chief executive role in January 2001. On 21 February 2019, Martin Stewart replaced John Fellet as CEO. He had previously worked for BSkyB, The Football Association and OSN. On 1 December 2020, Stewart left the company to return home to Europe. Sophie Maloney was immediately appointed to the CEO position.

Focus on streaming
In February 2015, Sky launched its own subscription-based video streaming service called Neon to allow New Zealanders to stream various HBO films and shows and to compete with US-based streaming service Netflix, which launched in New Zealand in March 2015. Sky had initially planned to launch Neon in 2014 but was delayed by systems bugs.

On 16 August 2019, Sky announced it had purchased Coliseum Sports Media's global rugby streaming service RugbyPass for approximately US$40 million.

On 19 December 2019, it was announced that Sky would be purchasing Spark New Zealand's streaming service Lightbox. On 14 June 2020, Sky confirmed that Lightbox would be merged into the Neon app on 7 July 2020. The merged service retains the Neon brand but uses Lightbox's interface and includes content drawn from both Neon and the old Lightbox.

Launch of broadband service
On 21 May 2020, Sky announced its plans to launch fibre broadband internet plans in 2021. Sky raised $157 million from investors with a discounted share issue to cover the cost of entering the broadband market. On 10 September 2020, Sky announced that a number of its staff members including Sky's then CEO, Martin Stewart, were trialing the broadband service in their homes. This testing was later expanded to a small group of customers in December 2020.

On 24 March 2021, Sky launched the broadband service initially for existing satellite customers only. Sky later expanded the offering to new customers on 17 May 2021.

Pursuing partnerships
On 22 August 2019, it was announced that Sky had signed a six-year agreement to take over from Westpac as the naming sponsor of Wellington Regional Stadium, effective 1 January 2020.

On 28 November 2019, Sky announced that TVNZ would be its free-to-air broadcast partner for the 2020 Summer Olympics, instead of its own free-to-air channel Prime.

On 27 October 2020, Sky announced a partnership with Spark, where the Sky Sport Now streaming service would be bundled with Spark Sport for a NZ$49.99 monthly subscription.

On 9 June 2021, Sky announced an exclusive partnership with Disney to provide Sky Broadband customers with a 12-month subscription to the Disney+ streaming service.

On 24 June 2021, Sky announced a partnership with Discovery New Zealand to provide coverage of The Championships, Wimbledon for free-to-air channel Three.

In response to the 2022 Russian invasion of Ukraine, Sky removed Russian state TV channel RT from its programming.  Sky spokesperson Chris Major stated that their decision to remove RT came following complaints from customers and consultation with the Broadcasting Standards Authority.

Products and services

Satellite television channels
Sky defines a virtual channel order that groups channels by their content.

General entertainment channels are below channel 31 which includes TVNZ's free-to-air TVNZ 1 (four regional markets for SD), free-to-air TVNZ 2 and free-to-air TVNZ Duke, Warner Bros. Discovery's free-to-air Three, free-to-air Bravo, free-to-air Eden, TLC, Living, ID, free-to-air HGTV and free-to-air Rush, ViacomCBS channels Comedy Central and MTV, NBCUniversal's Universal TV, Sky's Prime (three regional markets), Sky 5, Vibe, Jones!, Jones! too and Sky Box Sets, BBC UKTV, government funded free-to-air Whakaata Māori, ViacomCBS channels MTV Hits and MTV 80s, and The Shopping Channel. Sky Arts and SoHo are available as extra channels.

Movie channels are from 30 to 39 which includes Sky Movies Premiere (new releases), Sky Movies Comedy, Sky Movies Action, Sky Movies Greats (modern classics), Sky Movies Classics, Sky Movies Collection (themed) and Sky Movies Family. Rialto (independent) is available as an extra channel. Sky Box Office channels are available as pay-per-view from 40 to 49.

Sporting channels are from 50 to 69 which includes Sky Sport Select, Sky Sport 1 to 9, select Sky Sport Pop-Up channels for special sporting events, Disney's ESPN & ESPN2, TAB Trackside 1 and TAB Trackside 2. Sky Arena offers one off pay-per-view events.
 
Documentary channels are from 70 to 79 which includes targeted scheduling for Warner Bros. Discovery's Discovery, Animal Planet and Discovery Turbo, as well as Disney's National Geographic, BBC Earth, and Foxtel Networks versions of A+E Networks' Crime + Investigation and History.

Public service channels are from 80 to 85 which includes government funded free-to-air Te Reo and the Auckland regional channel Face TV.  The rural sponsored Country TV is an available extra channel.

News coverage channels are from 85 to 99 which includes government provided Parliament TV, Australia's Sky News, Warner Bros. Discovery's CNN International, Fox Corporation's Fox News, NBCUniversal's CNBC Australia, Al Jazeera English and BBC World News

Children & family entertainment channels are from 100 to 109 which includes the ViacomCBS channels NickMusic, Nickelodeon and Nick Jr., Warner Bros. Discovery's Cartoon Network and BBC Worldwide's CBeebies. Prior to 30 November 2019, Sky also provided the Disney and Disney Junior channels but discontinued these channels following the launch of the Disney+ streaming service in New Zealand on 19 November. In addition, Sky replaced the Sky Movies Disney channel with Sky Movies Family.

Religious channels are from 200 to 299 which includes Shine TV, Daystar, Sonlife Broadcasting Network and Hope Channel.

Channels of an Asian origin include the English-speaking CGTN Documentary on Channel 309 and CGTN on channel 310. Hindi language channels are from 150 to 152 and include Star Plus Hindi, Colors and Star Gold. ABS-CBN’s The Filipino Channel is also available on channel 160.

A selection of Jukebox radio channels from 400 to 499 are available called Sky Digital Music. With free-to-air radio from 420 to 429 which includes RNZ National, RNZ Concert and Tahu FM.

Timeshifted versions of general entertainment channels are from 501 to 599 for an hour delay of TVNZ 1 +1, TVNZ 2 +1, ThreePlus1, TVNZ Duke+1, Eden+1, Bravo Plus 1 and Prime Plus 1.

Channels for special services (system/hidden) are from 800 to 999 which includes Supercheap in-store radio and an auxiliary backup channel.

Previously Sky featured adult TV channels, including content from Playboy, but these were eventually discontinued.

High definition channels include:

 TVNZ 1
 TVNZ 2
 Three
 Prime
 Sky 5
 Vibe
 BBC UKTV
 SoHo
 Universal TV
 Comedy Central
 MTV
 Living
 MTV Hits
 Sky Arts
 TVNZ Duke
 Sky Movies channels
 Rialto
 Sky Box Office
 Sky Sport channels
 ESPN and ESPN2
 TAB Trackside 1 and TAB Trackside 2
 Sky Arena
 Discovery
 National Geographic
 BBC Earth
 Discovery Turbo

Due to satellite bandwidth constraints, the quality is lower for TVNZ 1, TVNZ 2 and Three than the free-to-air terrestrial versions.

MySky
All Sky customers have the option to subscribe to the MySky service, per each Kaon Sky box in order to activate PVR features on that box. This allows the customer to pause and rewind live television, as well as record three channels while watching a fourth live, on their Sky box. The current Kaon Sky box has 500GB of storage space. Another one of the advertised features of MySky is the ability to record series of programs using the "Series Link" feature. Additionally, an older Pace MySky box is available with 320GB storage and a "+" version of this box with a 1TB hard drive.

Streaming services

Sky On Demand
Sky announced late 2006 that it will be using the 30% reserved disk space in the PVR to offer a video on demand service to its My Sky customers. This service commenced in 2007 offering 12−15 movies at any one time. New titles were downloaded automatically from the Optus D1 satellite to the PVR and listed only when they are available for purchase and instant playback.

In November 2015, the Sky On Demand offering was extended to allow all Sky customers to watch subscribed content at a time that suits them, rather than according to the linear schedule. This removes the need to pre-record certain TV shows or films, because viewers can connect the updated decoder to their home broadband and choose stream content from the catalogue of options depending on which channels they subscribe to. This is more akin to on-demand services offered by TVNZ and Netflix, and is designed to give viewers more freedom.

Sky Go

Sky Go is Sky's video on demand and live streaming service, which was launched in 2011 as iSky. It can be accessed via the Sky Go website on PC or via a device via the Sky Go app.

Remote record
In August 2009 an online service was launched where customers can log on and set their My Sky boxes to record programmes. The instruction to record a programme is sent to the set-top boxes via satellite.

Sky TV Guide app
Sky has released a mobile app which works on iOS devices such as iPhone, iPad and iPod Touches, Android devices & Windows 8. The app contains an electronic program guide, remote record capabilities (for My Sky boxes), Facebook & Twitter social functions and automatic programme reminders. The app had over 50,000 downloads from the iTunes App Store in four weeks.

Sky Sport Now

In 2015, Sky launched an online streaming service called Fan Pass (branded as FAN PASS), which provided access to Sky Sport channels 1–4, including highlights on demand.  Pay-Per-View events could be purchased separately when available. This service was offered at a discount to Spark customers with unlimited broadband.

On 14 August 2019, Sky re-branded Fan Pass as Sky Sport Now, featuring live streams for all 10 Sky Sport channels, highlights, on demand, match statistics and points tables. Three passes are available for purchase: a week pass, a month pass and a 12-month Pass. Pay-Per-View events can be purchased separately when they become available.

On 27 October 2020, Sky announced that it would be bundling its Sky Sport Now streaming service with Spark Sport for a NZ$49.99 monthly subscription from 16 November 2020 onwards.

Neon

In February 2015, Sky launched Neon (branded as NEON), a subscription video on demand service. It is the only online streaming service in New Zealand where HBO shows, including Game of Thrones and Big Little Lies, can be legally streamed. Neon is available for streaming on desktop or laptop on all major browsers, apps for select iPad, iPhone and Android devices, as well as PlayStation 4 and Samsung Smart TV. Chromecast and Airplay functionality are available too. Prior to September 2019, Neon offered two packages: the TV package, which came with a free 14-day trial, or the TV & Movies package. In September 2019, Neon shifted to a single TV & Movies package worth $13.95 in order to compete with Netflix, Amazon Prime Video and Spark New Zealand's Lightbox.

In mid December 2019, it was announced that Sky would be purchasing rival streaming service Lightbox. For that period, Spark will continue to provide services to Lightbox customers while Sky will be footing the operational costs. On 7 July 2020, Sky formally merged the Lightbox app into Neon. This revamped streaming service allows users to stream on two devices, download films and shows onto devices, rent movies, and create multiple user profiles.

Discontinued products and services

Igloo

On 24 November 2011 Sky announced they had formed a partnership with Television New Zealand to launch a new low-cost pay television service during the first half of 2012. This was called Igloo and Sky had a 51% share in the venture. Details were announced on 8 December via a press release. Sky offered a selection of channels on a pre-pay basis.

The Igloo service was provided through DVB-T and was available in areas of New Zealand where Freeview's terrestrial service is available. Customers required an Igloo set top box and UHF aerial to use the Igloo service. Unlike Sky Digital and Sky 's former UHF service customers purchased their decoder from a retailer and the customer owned the equipment, the customer was also responsible for the installation of the equipment including the UHF aerial. Sky subscribers do not own their Sky decoders and are required to return the decoder on cancellation of their service, Sky will also arrange for a technician to install any equipment in the customers home including the satellite dish.
Igloo worked on a prepay system where the customer purchased basic channels for 30 days, the customer was able to discontinue their service at any time and could continue to be able to access free to air channels. Customers could also purchase one-off shows such as movies or sport events.

The Igloo service was closed on 1 March 2017, and Igloo boxes can still be used to access free to air channels by updating the system software of the box.

Fatso

Sky also owned an Online DVD and video game rental service called Fatso. It discontinued business in December 2017.

Magazine publishing
Sky provided a Skywatch monthly magazine to all its customers, published by Stuff and printed by Ovato. Skywatch once had a readership of 965,000 which made it the largest magazine read in New Zealand, and the largest monthly magazine. The magazine provided monthly listings for Sky channels, as well as highlights and features. The publication moved to digital only in April 2020 and was discontinued in August 2020.

In January 2007, Sky launched Sky Sport: The Magazine, as the published extension of the Sky Sport television package. The magazine featured articles by local and international sports writers, as well as sports photography. Sky TV Rugby commentator Scotty Stevenson was the editor. Publication ceased in June 2015.

Technical
Sky satellite subscribers receive a standard 60-centimetre satellite dish installed on their home along with set-top boxes as part of the installation.

Sky switched from the aging Optus B1 to the Optus D1 satellite for its DBS service on 15 November 2006. Initially, Sky used vertically polarised transponders on Optus D1 (as it had on Optus B1). However, on 31 July 2007 it moved its programming to horizontally polarised transponders with New Zealand-specific beams to be consistent with Freeview and to gain access to more transmission capacity. Sky have also purchased some of the capacity of Optus D3, which was launched mid August 2009, this gives Sky the ability to add more channels and upgrade existing channels to HD in the future.  However, due to the LNB switching that would be required the single D3 transponder lease was later dropped in 2011.

A set-top box (STB) is used to decrypt the satellite signals. Digital broadcasts are in DVB-compliant MPEG-4 AVC. Interactive services and the EPG use the proprietary OpenTV system.

Equipment ownership
When a customer subscribes to Sky they will have a decoder professionally installed and a satellite dish installed if one isn't already available. Sky maintains ownership of the equipment and part of the customers monthly subscription cost includes the rental of the decoder. Customers who have My Sky pay an additional cost per month. If a customer wants to discontinue their Sky service on a temporary basis the customer can switch to a decoder rental option which allows the customer to receive free to air channels only.

When the customer cancels a Sky subscription the customer is required to return the equipment but not the satellite dish. If the customer moves to another address the customer is required to leave the satellite dish behind and arrange for a new satellite dish to be installed at the new address, at the customers expense, if a satellite dish has not already been installed at the new address. The satellite dish can be used to receive the Freeview satellite service using a Freeview set top box.

Reputation
The 2016 NZ Corporate Reputation Index placed Sky in last place. The Corporate Reputation Index lists the top 25 companies in New Zealand based on revenue sourced from the 2015 Deloitte Top 200 list, and is judged by consumers with no company input. In the 2016 list Sky had dropped two places to number 25 from 2015.

In the 2020 Brand Reputation Index, Sky came in at Number 9 in the Top 10 Brands Delivering Brand Purpose.

See also
 Optus satellite failures

References

External links
 Official site
 New Zealand Stock Exchange Listing.

Companies listed on the Australian Securities Exchange
Companies listed on the New Zealand Exchange
Television networks in New Zealand
New Zealand subscription television services
Companies based in Auckland
Television channels and stations established in 1987
1987 establishments in New Zealand